This is a list of lighthouses in Madagascar.

See also
 Lists of lighthouses and lightvessels

References

External links

Madagascar
Lighthouses
Lighthouses in Madagascar
Lighthouses